A number of steamships were named Magdalena:

, a German cargo ship in service 1940–47
, a Hamburg America Line ocean liner in service 1928–34

See also
, three ships with this name

Ship names